Phenolic acids or phenolcarboxylic acids are  types of aromatic acid compounds. Included in that class are substances containing a phenolic ring and an organic carboxylic acid function (C6-C1 skeleton). Two important naturally occurring types of phenolic acids are hydroxybenzoic acids and hydroxycinnamic acids, which are derived from non-phenolic molecules of benzoic and cinnamic acid, respectively.

Occurrences 
Phenolic acids can be found in many plant species. Their content in dried fruits can be high.

Natural phenols in horse grams (Macrotyloma uniflorum) are mostly phenolic acids, namely 3,4-dihydroxy benzoic, p-hydroxy benzoic, vanillic, caffeic, p-coumaric, ferulic, syringic, and sinapinic acids.

Phenolic acids can be found in several mushroom-forming species of basidiomycetes. It is also a part of the humic substances, which are the major organic constituents of soil humus.

Many phenolic acids can be found in human urine.

Chemistry 
Immobilized Candida antarctica lipase can be used to catalyze the direct acetylation of flavonoids with phenolic acids.

See also 
 Benzoic acid
 Aromatic alcohol
 List of phytochemicals in food

References

 Phenolic acids